Valle del Conlara Airport  is an international airport serving Santa Rosa de Conlara, a town in the San Luis Province of Argentina. It also serves the city of Merlo,  to the east.

The Santa Rosa De Conlara VOR-DME (Ident: SRC) is located on the field.

Airlines and destinations

See also

Transport in Argentina
List of airports in Argentina

References

External links 
OpenStreetMap - Valle del Conlara Airport

Airports in Argentina
San Luis Province